A câmara municipal (meaning literally municipal chamber and often referred as câmara de vereadores or simply as câmara) is a type of municipal governing body, existing in several countries of the Community of Portuguese Language Countries. 

In Portugal, Cape Verde, Guinea Bissau and Timor-Leste, a câmara municipal is the executive body of a municipality. In Brazil, it is the legislature of a municipality. São Tome and Príncipe has similar câmaras distritais (district chambers), which are the executive bodies of the districts (municipalities).

In all these countries, the members of a câmara are known as vereadores (aldermen).

Brazil 
The Brazilian câmaras municipais or câmaras de vereadores have their origin in the municipal administration model inherited from Portugal. However, while the Portuguese câmaras evolved towards becoming executive bodies, in Brazil they evolved towards becoming the legislative bodies of the municipalities, especially after the creation of the prefeituras municipais (municipal prefectures) in the 1930s. In Brazil, the executive municipal power is now vested in the prefeituras municipais, each headed by the prefeito (mayor). 

Each câmara is composed of a number of elected vereadores.

Portugal 
Its members (vereadores, aldermen) are elected by the Hondt method, serve year-round and are paid. The president of a Municipal Chamber is the head of the most-voted list. The Câmara Municipal has an odd number of aldermen (from five to thirteen), determined by the number of registered voters within the municipality, with the exceptions of Lisbon (fixed at 17 aldermen) and Porto (15 aldermen).

The term can also refer to the building where the Municipal Chamber offices are located, i.e., the City Hall, although it is more properly termed Paços do Concelho (literally, the "Palace of the Concelho").

A Câmara municipal is an executive body of a municipal, a level higher than the Junta de freguesia.
The legislature equivalent of Câmara municipal is the Assembleia Municipal.

See also 
 Assembleia Municipal
 Assembleia de freguesia
 Junta de freguesia
 List of municipalities of Portugal
 Portuguese local election, 2005

References 
 PORTUGAL: a country study, Federal Research Division, Library of Congress; Edited by Eric Solsten (public domain)''

Local government in Portugal